The Pokémon Company (株式会社ポケモン, Kabushiki gaisha Pokemon) is a Japanese company responsible for brand management, production, publishing, marketing, and licensing of the Pokémon franchise, which consists of video game software, a trading card game, anime television series, films, manga, home entertainment products, merchandise, and other ventures. It was established through a joint investment by the three companies holding the copyright of Pokémon: Nintendo, Game Freak, and Creatures. It was founded in April 1998 originally to operate the Pokémon Center stores in Japan before expanding to the entire franchise in October 2000 as it rebranded to its current name. The company is headquartered in the Roppongi Hills Mori Tower in Roppongi, Minato, Tokyo.

The company has separate subsidiaries that handle operations in different parts of the world, with the Pokémon Company International supporting the territories outside Asia and being responsible for brand management, licensing, marketing, the Pokémon Trading Card Game, the animated TV series, home entertainment, and the official Pokémon website on the territories outside Asia.

The Pokémon Company also handles publishing of all Pokémon video games since 2001, except that Nintendo handles the publishing for console titles outside Japan. The Pokémon Company is mostly responsible for marketing and funding, while Nintendo handles distribution of the titles in Japan and outside it. Both companies work together in localization, production, QA, and other aspects. The company is solely responsible for publishing and licensing mobile Pokémon titles, unlike console titles where it has help from Nintendo.

History 

In 1998, Nintendo, Creatures, and Game Freak established  in order to effectively manage the Pokémon Center stores in Japan. After the popularity of Pokémon Gold and Silver, they received many merchandising proposals from around the world. Companies were interested in working with the Pokémon brand. At that time, Tsunekazu Ishihara of Creatures was the person in charge of approving licensed products. Because of the sheer volume of products, Ishihara thought it was too much work for one person to handle. At the same time, in order for the franchise to continue, Ishihara wished to further expand the franchise with long-term goals, such as continuing the anime series, and releasing a movie every year. It was then decided that a new organization was needed in order to gather together all the strands of brand management.

This led the three companies to turn The Pokémon Center Company into The Pokémon Company in order to further expand its scope, responsibilities, and areas of business. According to Satoru Iwata, establishing The Pokémon Company was one of his first projects at Nintendo.

Managing the Pokémon Center stores is still a pillar for the company. In total, there are stores in 11 locations: Sapporo, Tohoku (Sendai), Tokyo, Skytree Town (Oshiage), Tokyo-Bay (Chiba), Yokohama, Nagoya, Kyoto, Osaka, Hiroshima and Fukuoka.

The United States branch (Pokémon USA, Inc.) opened in 2001 to handle licensing overseas in the Americas. Nintendo Australia is responsible for some licensing and marketing of Pokémon products in Australia and New Zealand because The Pokémon Company does not have an Australian branch.

Since 2001, nearly all Pokémon products are represented as "©Pokémon" in the copyright acknowledgments with the usual three of "©Nintendo", "©GAME FREAK inc." and "©Creatures Inc." The three companies also have ownership of all of the Pokémon-related trademarks in Japan while Nintendo is the sole owner of Pokémon-related trademarks in other countries. Licensed toys are made by third- and second-party companies such as Tomy and Jazwares.

In October 2001, 4Kids Entertainment acquired a 3% stake in The Pokémon Company for an undisclosed sum. They liquidated this stake 4 years later for US$960,000.

In 2006, Pokémon Korea, Inc. was founded to manage the company's operations in South Korea. Its headquarters is located in Seoul.

In 2009, Pokémon USA and Pokémon UK merged to become The Pokémon Company International, which handles American and European Pokémon operations under the administration of Kenji Okubo. The company's office in the United States is located in Bellevue, Washington and its office in the United Kingdom is located in London. Some Australian operations are controlled by Nintendo Australia.

Pokémon Center Co., Ltd. was established in August 2011 to manage the Pokémon Center brand and stores in Japan. Its operations include operating the Pokémon Store and Pokémon Center stores, maintaining the Pokémon Stand vending machines and operating the Pokémon Center Online, as well as overseeing the design and manufacture of Japanese Pokémon Center brand merchandise. Yomiomi Uego is currently the president and CEO.

In April 2022, The Pokémon Company International announced the acquisition of Millennium Print Group for an undisclosed sum. The printing company has already been producing and packing cards for the Pokémon Trading Card Game since 2015 after partnering up with The Pokémon Company. The move will not have a major effect on Millennium's day-to-day productions, with the company still operating as a separate entity; The Pokémon Company will instead be providing "investment and industry expertise" while assisting Millennium in expanding its capabilities and infrastructure.

On June 1, 2022, it was announced that Pokémon creator and Game Freak founder Junichi Masuda left the company and would be part of The Pokémon Company at a position called Chief Creative Fellow, being more involved with the franchise as a whole instead of just the video games.

List of works

Games 
 Pokémon video game series
 List of Pokémon video games
 Pokémon Trading Card Game
 Pokémon Trading Figure Game

Anime 
 Pokémon anime television series
 Pokémon anime film series

Books 
 Pokémon manga
 Pokémon Junior book series

Live-action film 
 Pokémon Detective Pikachu

See also 
 List of highest-grossing media franchises

References

External links 
  (English website)

Pokémon
Anime companies
Anime industry
Companies based in Tokyo
Entertainment companies established in 1998
Entertainment companies of Japan
Japanese companies established in 1998
Joint ventures
Nintendo
Video game companies established in 1998
Video game companies of Japan
Video game publishers